Isthmiade buirettei is a species of beetle in the family Cerambycidae. It was described by Tavakilian and Peñaherrera-Leiva in 2005.

References

Isthmiade
Beetles described in 2005